Cameron Drew Erving (born August 23, 1992) is an American football offensive tackle for the Carolina Panthers of the National Football League (NFL). He was selected in the first round of the 2015 NFL Draft by the Cleveland Browns. He played college football at Florida State.

Early years
Erving attended Colquitt County High School, where he played as a defensive tackle. He had 98 tackles (48 solo) as a senior.

College career

Erving played in three games as a defensive tackle as a true freshman in 2010. He recorded one tackle before a back injury caused him to have a medical redshirt. He was a backup defensive tackle and played in all 13 games as a redshirt freshman in 2011. He finished the season with 20 tackles and one sack. 

Erving was moved to offensive tackle as a sophomore in 2012. He started all 14 games at left tackle, protecting quarterback EJ Manuel's blind side.

As a junior in 2013, Erving was a first-team All-ACC selection at left tackle, after protecting quarterback Jameis Winston's blind side, who became the youngest player ever to win the Heisman Trophy. He was also named a second-team All-American by the Associated Press. 

He began his senior season in 2014 as the starting left tackle, but was moved to center after Austin Barron suffered an arm injury in the fifth game against Wake Forest University.

Erving made 42 consecutive starts on the offensive line during his college career. He is a member of the Florida State chapter of Phi Delta Theta fraternity.

Professional career

Cleveland Browns
On April 30, 2015, Erving was selected with the 19th overall pick by the Cleveland Browns in the 2015 NFL draft. Erving signed a four-year contract worth roughly $10 million, with a signing bonus of about $5 million. As a rookie, he spent time at right guard and left tackle during training camp. He appeared in 16 games with 4 starts at left guard.

In 2016, after longtime starting center Alex Mack left the Browns via free agency, the coaching staff switched Erving from guard to center as his replacement. He sat out three games after suffering a bruised lung in the second game against the Baltimore Ravens. He started 12 games at center, but struggled with his level of play and with his shotgun snaps. He was moved to the right tackle position for the season finale in place of Austin Pasztor, but suffered an MCL injury during the game against the Pittsburgh Steelers. 

In 2017, he was competing for the right tackle starting position with Shon Coleman. He struggled during training camp and also suffered a calf injury.

Kansas City Chiefs

On August 30, 2017, Erving was traded to the Kansas City Chiefs for a 2018 fifth-round pick (#159-Daurice Fountain). He played in 13 games, making four starts (three at right guard and one at left tackle).

On May 2, 2018, the Chiefs declined the fifth-year option on Erving's contract. On September 4, 2018, Erving signed a two-year contract extension with the Chiefs. Although he was considered to be at risk of making the team, he earned the starting left guard position during training camp. He appeared in 14 games with 13 starts.

In 2019, he started eight games at left tackle, while Eric Fisher recovered from a sports-hernia surgery. Erving won his first championship when the Chiefs defeated the San Francisco 49ers 31-20 in Super Bowl LIV.

The Chiefs declined the 2020 option on Erving's contract, making him a free agent.

Dallas Cowboys
On May 6, 2020, Erving signed a one-year contract with the Dallas Cowboys, to compete for the swing tackle position. He missed most of training camp with an undisclosed injury, returning to activity until August 27. Because of the season-ending hip injury to La'el Collins, he competed for the starting right tackle position, but was passed on the depth chart by rookie Terence Steele. In the season opener against the Los Angeles Rams, he sprained the medial collateral ligament in his left knee while blocking for a field goal attempt. On September 15, he was placed on injured reserve with a sprained knee. He was designated to return from injured reserve on October 7, and began practicing with the team again. He was activated on October 24.

In the seventh game against the Washington Football Team, he was named the starter at left tackle, replacing Brandon Knight who had a knee injury. In the eleventh game against the Washington Football Team, he suffered a sprained right knee injury on the opening series and was replaced with Knight. On December 11, 2020, he was placed back on injured reserve, making him ineligible to return during the season. He appeared in 6 games with 5 starts at left tackle.

Carolina Panthers
On March 17, 2021, Erving signed a two-year contract with the Carolina Panthers. He was named the Panthers starting left tackle for 2021. He suffered a calf injury in Week 9 and was placed on injured reserve on November 8, 2021. He was activated on December 11.

References

External links

 
 Cleveland Browns bio
 Florida State Seminoles bio

1992 births
Living people
People from Moultrie, Georgia
Players of American football from Georgia (U.S. state)
American football centers
American football offensive tackles
American football defensive tackles
Florida State Seminoles football players
Cleveland Browns players
Kansas City Chiefs players
Dallas Cowboys players
Carolina Panthers players